Thomas Andrews Jr. (7 February 1873 – 15 April 1912) was a British businessman and shipbuilder. He was managing director and head of the drafting department of the shipbuilding company Harland and Wolff in Belfast, Ireland. 

He was the naval architect in charge of the plans for the ocean liner Titanic and perished along with more than 1,500 others when the ship sank during her maiden voyage.

Early life

Thomas Andrews was born on 7 February 1873 at Ardara House, Comber, County Down, in Ireland, to The Rt. Hon. Thomas Andrews, a member of the Privy Council of Ireland, and Eliza Pirrie. Andrews was a Presbyterian of Scottish descent, and like his brother considered himself British. 
His siblings included J. M. Andrews, the future Prime Minister of Northern Ireland, and Sir James Andrews, the future Lord Chief Justice of Northern Ireland. Thomas Andrews lived with his family in Ardara, Comber. In 1884, he began attending the Royal Belfast Academical Institution until 1889 when, at the age of sixteen, he began a premium apprenticeship at Harland and Wolff where his uncle, the Viscount Pirrie, was part owner.

Harland and Wolff
At Harland and Wolff, Andrews began with three months in the joiners' shop, followed by a month in the cabinetmakers' and then a further two months working on the ships. The last eighteen months of his five-year apprenticeship were spent in the drawing office. He worked during the day and continued his studies in the evening hours. In 1901, boarding at 11 Wellington Place, after working in the many departments of the company, he became the manager of the construction works. That same year, he also became a member of the Institution of Naval Architects. In 1907, he was appointed the managing director and head of the drafting department at Harland and Wolff. By that point, Andrews had earned a reputation as a genius in the field of ship design. During his long years of apprenticeship, study, and work, he had become well-loved in the company and amongst the shipyard's employees. His kindness and generosity was well-documented. He was always willing to acknowledge the hard work of other people, and his wife recalled that he had of himself "the humblest opinion of anyone I ever knew."

On 24 June 1908, he married Helen Reilly Barbour, daughter of textile industrialist John Doherty Barbour and sister to Sir John Milne Barbour- known as "Milne". Their daughter, Elizabeth Law-Barbour Andrews (known by her initials, "ELBA"), was born on 27 November 1910. The couple lived at Dunallan, 12 Windsor Avenue, Belfast, now numbered 20, and worshipped at First Presbyterian Church on Rosemary Street. It is known that Andrews took Helen to view the RMS Titanic one night, shortly before Elizabeth was born.

RMS Titanic

All three ships were designed by Andrews, William Pirrie and general manager Alexander Carlisle to be the largest, safest and most luxurious ships at sea. As he had done for the other ships he had overseen, Andrews familiarised himself with every detail of Olympic, Titanic and Britannic, in order to ensure that they were in optimal working order. Notably, Andrews’s suggestions that the ship have 48 lifeboats (instead of the 20 it ultimately carried) as well as a double hull and watertight bulkheads that went up to B deck, were overruled.

Andrews headed a group of Harland and Wolff workers called the guarantee group, who went on the maiden voyages of their ships in order to observe ship operations and spot any necessary improvements. Titanic was no exception, so Andrews and the rest of his Harland and Wolff group travelled from Belfast to Southampton on Titanic for the beginning of her maiden voyage on 10 April 1912. During the voyage, Andrews took notes on various improvements he felt were needed, primarily cosmetic changes to various facilities. However, on 14 April, Andrews remarked to a friend that Titanic was "as nearly perfect as human brains can make her."

On 14 April at 11:40 PM, Titanic struck an iceberg on the ship's starboard side. Andrews was in his cabin, planning changes he wanted to make to the ship, and barely noticed the collision. Captain Edward J. Smith had Andrews summoned to help examine the damage. Andrews and Captain Smith discussed the damage to the ship shortly after the collision and toured the damaged section of the ship, receiving several reports of the vessel's damage. Andrews determined that the first five of the ship's sixteen watertight compartments were rapidly flooding, more than the four that the vessel was supposed to withstand. He relayed this information to Captain Smith, adding that in his opinion, the vessel had only about an hour before foundering. He also informed Smith of the severe shortage of lifeboats on board the ship.

As the evacuation began, Andrews tirelessly searched staterooms telling the passengers to put on lifebelts and go up on deck. Many survivors testified to have met or spotted Andrews several times.
Fully aware of the short time the ship had left and of the lack of lifeboat space for all passengers and crew, he continued to urge reluctant people into the lifeboats in the hope of filling them with as many people as possible. Titanic sank at 2:20 a.m, and Andrews perished along with more than 1,500 others. His body was never recovered.

Death
Andrews was reportedly last seen by John Stewart, a steward on the ship, after approximately 2:05 a.m. Andrews was standing alone in the 1st-class smoking room with his arms folded, his lifebelt lying on a nearby table.  Stewart asked him: "Aren't you going to have a try for it, Mr. Andrews?" Andrews did not answer or move, apparently in a state of shock. Walter Lord suggested that he was staring at a Norman Wilkinson painting over the fire place that depicted the entrance to Plymouth Sound, which Titanic had been expected to visit on her return voyage. This led to popular belief that Andrews may have made no attempt to escape and waited in the smoking room for the end.

Although this has become one of the most famous stories of the Titanic disaster – published in a 1912 book (Thomas Andrews: Shipbuilder by Shan Bullock) and thereby perpetuated – there is circumstantial evidence to show that Stewart, in fact, left the ship in lifeboat No. 15 at approximately 1:40 a.m., half an hour before his reputed sighting of Andrews. In Thomas Andrews: Shipbuilder, Bullock wrote that Andrews likely stayed in the smoking room for some time to gather his thoughts, then continued assisting with the evacuation. Bullock even discussed several other very later sightings of Andrews after that moment. Another sighting of Andrews was around 2:00 a.m., where he was seen on the back of the boat deck. The crowd had begun to stir, but some women remained reluctant to leave the ship. To be heard and to draw attention to himself, Andrews waved his arms and called to them in a loud voice. This did not do anything, so he began frantically throwing deck chairs into the ocean for people to use as floatation devices. Bullock also said that Andrews was seen, carrying a lifebelt, possibly the same lifebelt that was lying on the table in the smoking room, heading to the bridge, perhaps in search of Captain Smith. In addition, mess steward Cecil Fitzpatrick claimed to have seen Andrews and Captain Smith together on the bridge just a few minutes before the ship began its final plunge, and that both men jumped overboard just before the bridge was submerged.

Legacy

On 19 April 1912, his father received a telegram from his mother's cousin, who had spoken with survivors in New York: "INTERVIEW WITH TITANIC'S OFFICERS. ALL UNANIMOUS THAT ANDREWS DIED A HEROIC DEATH, THINKING ONLY OF OTHER'S SAFETY. EXTEND HEARTFELT SYMPATHY TO ALL."

Newspaper accounts of the disaster labelled Andrews a hero. Mary Sloan, a stewardess on the ship, whom Andrews persuaded to enter a lifeboat, later wrote in a letter: "Mr. Andrews met his fate like a true hero, realising the great danger, and gave up his life to save the women and children of the Titanic. They will find it hard to replace him." A short biography was produced within the year by Shan Bullock at the request of Sir Horace Plunkett, a member of Parliament, who felt that Andrews' life was worthy of being memorialised.

In his home town, Comber, one of the earliest and most substantial memorials for a single victim of the Titanic disaster was built. The Thomas Andrews Jr. Memorial Hall was opened in January 1914. The architects were Young and McKenzie with sculpted work by the artist Sophia Rosamond Praeger. The hall is now maintained by the South Eastern Education Board and used by The Andrews Memorial Primary School. An Ulster History Circle blue plaque is located on his house in Windsor Avenue, Belfast.

Asteroid 245158 Thomasandrews was named in his honour in 2004.

Portrayals

Patrick Macnee (1956; Kraft Television Theatre; A Night to Remember)
Michael Goodliffe (1958; A Night to Remember)
Geoffrey Whitehead (1979; S.O.S. Titanic; TV Movie)
Victor Garber (1997; Titanic)
Michael Cerveris (1997; Titanic; Broadway Musical)
Vern Urich (1998; Titanic: Secrets Revealed; TV Documentary)
Don Lynch (2003; Ghosts of the Abyss; Documentary)
Damian O'Hare (2005; Titanic: Birth of a Legend; TV Documentary)
Paul Mundell (2011; Curiosity Episode: "What Sank Titanic?")
Stephen Campbell Moore (2012; Titanic; TV series/3 episodes)
Billy Carter (2012; Titanic: Blood and Steel; TV series/12 episodes)
Nick Danan (2012; The Titanic Boys; Stage Production- Grand Opera House, Belfast)
Stephen Hogan (2012; Saving The Titanic; PBS TV Movie)
Robert Bagdon (2013; Belfast Air; Short Film)
Greg Castiglioni (2013; Titanic (musical) (London premier) & 2015; (Toronto); directed by Thom Southerland)
Kazuki Kato (2015; Titanic; Japanese Musical; directed by Thom Sutherland)

Bibliography
Thomas Andrews, shipbuilder (Dublin ; and London : Maunsel and company, ltd, 1912.)

References

External links

Thomas Andrews on Titanic-Titanic.com
Encyclopedia Titanica Biography of Thomas Andrews
LibraryIreland.com, "Thomas Andrews Shipbuilder", a 1912 biography of Thomas Andrews

1873 births
1912 deaths
1910s missing person cases
19th-century Presbyterians
20th-century Presbyterians
19th-century British businesspeople
British Presbyterians
British people of Scottish descent
British naval architects
Deaths on the RMS Titanic
People educated at the Royal Belfast Academical Institution
People from Comber
People who died at sea
Ulster Scots people